Golam Kabud-e Olya or Galam Kabud-e Olya  may refer to:
 Golam Kabud-e Olya, Kermanshah
 Galam Kabud-e Olya, Sarpol-e Zahab, Kermanshah Province